Natacha Randriantefy (born 14 March 1978) is a former professional tennis player from Madagascar.

In her career, she won one singles title and eight doubles titles on the ITF Women's Circuit. On 5 August 2002, she reached her best singles ranking of world No. 325. On the same date, she peaked at No. 173 in the doubles rankings.

Playing for Madagascar at the Fed Cup, Randriantefy has a win–loss record of 7–5.

She was the Madagascan's Fed Cup team captain in 2014, and 2016.

Natacha retired from professional tennis 2010.

Personal
Born in Antananarivo, Randriantefy was coached by father, Max; mother Olga is a language professor. Her sister Dally is also a tennis player.

ITF Circuit finals

Singles: 2 (1–1)

Doubles: 16 (8–8)

References

<https://www.independent.co.uk/sport/olympics-barcelona-1992-madagascars-finest-hour-tennis-1536302.html/>

External links
 
 
 

1978 births
Living people
Malagasy female tennis players
Olympic tennis players of Madagascar
People from Antananarivo
Tennis players at the 1992 Summer Olympics
Tennis players at the 1996 Summer Olympics
African Games medalists in tennis
African Games gold medalists for Madagascar
African Games bronze medalists for Madagascar
Competitors at the 1995 All-Africa Games